Chris Parry may refer to:
Chris Parry (lighting designer) (1952–2007), theatrical lighting designer
Chris Parry (Royal Navy officer)
Chris Parry (producer) (born 1949), founder of Fiction Records